The 1987 South American Championships in Athletics were held in São Paulo, Brazil, between 8 and 11 October.

Medal summary

Men's events

Women's events

Medal table

External links
 Men Results – GBR Athletics
 Women Results – GBR Athletics
 Medallists

S
South American Championships in Athletics
A
International athletics competitions hosted by Brazil
1987 in South American sport
1987 in Brazilian sport